Eric Grate  (August 14, 1896 – August 3, 1983) was a Swedish sculptor, painter and graphics artist.

Education
Eric Grate studied at the Royal Academy of Arts in Stockholm between 1917 and 1920. Thereafter he undertook study trips to Germany, especially to Munich,  and to Italy and Greece. He moved to Paris in 1924 and stayed there for ten years. In France he lived in the companionship of a number of other Swedish artists, including Nils Dardel, Isaac Grünewald, Sigrid Hjertén, Otto G. Carlsund and Otte Sköld. Between 1941 and 1951 he was a professor at the [Swedish] Royal Academy of Arts.

Grate has been commissioned for at great number of public works of art in Sweden. The most famous of its time was The Etymological Woman Theft which was erected outside the premises of Karolinska Institutet in Solna, a suburb of Stockholm, towards the end of the 1950s. This heralded the start of one of the fiercest public debates about the arts in Sweden during the 20th century. The majority of the faculty of the Institute protested against the sculpture as indecent and against the ethics of medicine. The controversy was not resolved until a decision by the Swedish Superior Court of Administrative Matters was taken in favour of the sculpture.

Public works of art
The Urn of the Mines district iron ore 109 cm in height (1921–22), Gothenburg. This urn was manufactured by Näfvekvarns bruk (Näfvekvarn Iron Works) in a series and has been purchased by a number of Swedish museums
Faunfigur, Faun figure (1923), Hotel Liseberg, Gothenburg
Statues at the Norra Kungstornet Building (1925), Kungsgatan in Stockholm
Relief above the entrance of the Art Exhibition Building in Falun (1936)
Folkvisan, The Folk song (1937), Bromma High School in Stockholm, Liseberg Amusement Park in Gothenburg, Bäckängsgymnasiet in Borås
Årstiderna, The Seasons limestone (1937–41),  Rosenbad (The Government Chancellery), Stockholm
Folket och tekniken, The People and the Technology, part of a relief in chamotte clay (1937), decoration for the World Exhibition in Paris 1937, Runö Training Centre, Åkersberga
De fyra vindarna, The Four Winds (1937–41), four reliefs at front of the extension of the City Hall of Gothenburg by Gunnar Asplund
Badet, The Bath and Nereid two reliefs in terracotta (1943), The City Swimming Hall of Trelleborg
Sommaren, The Summer or Ung man, Young Man granite 224 cm in height (1944), Lundby, Gothenburg
Våren, The Spring bronze 125 cm in height (1944), Härlanda, Gothenburg and Museum Park in Alingsås
Anadyomene (1947–52), Hudiksvall
Förvandlingarnas brunn, The Fountain of Transformation, granite (1943–55), the Marabou Park in Sundbyberg
Navigare necesse est bronze 1953,  Rödaberg Primary School, Stockholm
Liggande kvinna, Declining Woman (ca 1954) bronze in a fountain, Västertorp Centre, Stockholm
Trädet, The Tree (ca 1954) bronze, Västertorp Centre, Stockholm
Två dansande. Two Dancers (1955), Byttorpskolan (school) in Borås
Vindarnas grotta, Cave of the Winds (1960–71), outside the City Hall of Västerås by Sven Ahlbom
Monument över Yxman, Monument over an Axe Man bronze 3.5 m in height (raised 1967), Rålambshov Park, Stockholm. A replica in a minor format is situated at Blockhusudden at Djurgården in Stockholm
Gudinna vid hyperboreiskt hav, Goddess by an Hyperborean Sea granite in a fountain 4 m long (1949–56), City Hall Square in Gävle.
Entomologiskt kvinnorov, Entomological Raping bronze (1956–58),  Royal Institute of Medicine, Solna
Snäckfågel, Shell Bird bronze 255 cm in height (1960–61), outside Hotel Opalen, Gothenburg and the Central Square in Eslöv
Silvatica bronze, the Esplanade in Nässjö
Nike från Sant Andria, Nike from Sant Andria bronze 206 cm in height (1967–68), outside the Public Library in Norrköping
Sparvguden, The God of Sparrows (1972–73), Eric Grate's Park outside the City Hall of Solna
Hjärtblad (1974), Cotyledones, outside the Regional Council Headquarters Building in Kristianstad

Further reading
Pontus Grate: Under grekisk himmel – Eric Grate och antiken (Under a Greek Sky – Eric Grate and the Antic World). Kristianstad 2005 
Pontus Grate & Ragnar von Holten: Eric Grate. Sveriges Allmänna Konstförening nr 87. Uddevalla 1978
Ragnar von Holten: Surrealismen i svensk konst (Surrealism in Swedish Art). Carlssons Bokförlag, Stockholm 1969
Ragnar von Holten, Sven Sandström et al.: Eric Grate Skulptur (Eric Grate Sculpture). Kalejdoskop förlag, Malmö 1990 
En bok om Eric Grate (A book about Eric Grate). Allhelms, Malmö 1963.

External links
 Eric Grate's web site 

1896 births
1983 deaths
Grate Eric
Recipients of the Prince Eugen Medal
20th-century Swedish sculptors